Angus Ross (born 4 October 1968) is a New Zealand bobsledder. He competed at the 1998 Winter Olympics and the 2002 Winter Olympics.

References

External links
 

1968 births
Living people
New Zealand male bobsledders
Olympic bobsledders of New Zealand
Bobsledders at the 1998 Winter Olympics
Bobsledders at the 2002 Winter Olympics
Sportspeople from Christchurch